"Last Goodbye" is a 1994 song by singer-songwriter Jeff Buckley, from his album Grace. It was the second single released from the album, after the title song. It was Buckley's most commercially successful song in the US, earning him a belated alternative hit in early 1995, peaking at #19 on the U.S. Billboard Alternative Songs.  In Australia, the single peaked at #88 on the ARIA Singles Chart.

"Last Goodbye" was originally titled "Unforgiven", and had a more straightforward rock feel and instrumentation; it was first recorded at a demo session in 1990. A live version of the song, still titled "Unforgiven", was recorded in 1993 and released on the posthumous 2003 album Live at Sin-é (Legacy Edition).

The song also featured at number 3 on Australia's Triple J's 'Hottest 100 of 20 Years' countdown.

Music video
A music video was created for "Last Goodbye", which showed Buckley and the rest of the band playing the song on a stage while video was projected onto them and the wall behind them.

Track listing

UK CD 1 (6620422)

"Last Goodbye (Edit)"
"Last Goodbye (Full Version)"
"Last Goodbye (Live and Acoustic in Japan)"

UK CD 2 (6620425)

"Last Goodbye (Full Version)"
"Dream Brother (Live in Hamburg)"
"So Real (Live and Acoustic in Japan)"

Japanese EP (SRCS-7592)

"Last Goodbye (Edit)"
"Mojo Pin (Live at Wetlands)"
"Kanga-Roo"
"Lost Highway"

Soundtrack appearances and covers
The song is included in the soundtrack of the 2001 film Vanilla Sky.

A cover of the song by actress Scarlett Johansson, done with only voice and piano, appeared on the soundtrack of the 2009 film He's Just Not That Into You.

The song was sung by Andy Mientus in the 2013 episode "The Producers" of the television show Smash.

Other appearances
On January 12, 2005, the famed Washington, D.C./Baltimore, MD alternative radio station WHFS played "Last Goodbye" as their final track before going under new management as a modern Latin music station. It has also been used by other alternative stations as their last song, including WRXP in New York City (before switching to a simulcast of WFAN) and WBRU in Providence.

The song appeared on an episode of Hindsight.

Charts

References

Jeff Buckley songs
Songs about suicide
1994 singles
1994 songs
Columbia Records singles
Songs written by Jeff Buckley